The Poleshuks, also known as Polesians are an ethnic group that lives in Polesia (a.k.a. Polesie and Polissia). Their language (or dialect), Polesian, forms a dialect continuum with the Ukrainian and Belarusian languages. In addition, Polesian includes many local variations and dialects, or sub-dialects.

History

During and after World War II, the Poleshuks developed a strong sense of identity and currently the ethnic group of Poleshuks is considered one of the distinct cultural and ethnic identities in the area, while most of the population of the Belarusian, Polish and Ukrainian parts of the region of Polesie have assimilated with the respective nations.

At the end of the 1980s, there was a minor campaign in Soviet Byelorussia for the creation of a standard written language for the dialect based on the dialects of Polesia launched by Belarusian writer Nikolai Shelyagovich and his associates as part of his activities for the recognition of Poleshuks as a separate ethnicity and for their autonomy. However, they received almost no support and the campaign eventually melted away.

See also

Polekhs
Podlashuks
Tutejszy

References

Ethnic groups in Belarus
Slavic ethnic groups
Ethnic groups in Ukraine
Demographic history of Poland